Kałki may refer to the following places:
Kałki, Lubusz Voivodeship (west Poland)
Kałki, Masovian Voivodeship (east-central Poland)
Kałki, Warmian-Masurian Voivodeship (north Poland)

See also
Kalki (disambiguation)